C. M. and Vina Clark House, also known as Rosemont and Clark Welling House, is a historic home located at Montrose, Henry County, Missouri.  It was built in 1913, and is -story brick and frame dwelling with a combination of Late Victorian and Colonial Revival style design elements.

It was listed on the National Register of Historic Places in 1997.

References

Houses on the National Register of Historic Places in Missouri
Victorian architecture in Missouri
Colonial Revival architecture in Missouri
Houses completed in 1913
Buildings and structures in Henry County, Missouri
National Register of Historic Places in Henry County, Missouri